A list of films produced in Brazil in 2000 (see 2000 in film):

2000

See also
2000 in Brazil
2000 in Brazilian television

References  

2000
Films
Brazilian